Fernando Alonso (born 1981) is a Spanish racing driver.

Fernando Alonso may  also refer to:

People 
Fernando Alonso (engineer) (born 1956), Spanish engineer
Fernando Alonso (dancer) (1914–2013), Cuban ballet dancer

Fictional characters 
 Fernando Alonso (character), a character voiced by the racing driver namesake in the Spanish version of Cars 2